Geoff Dugmore (born 12 April 1960) is a Scottish drummer, musical director and producer. He was a member of the bands The Europeans, and Wildlife.

Career 
Educated at Kelvinside Academy in Glasgow, Scotland, Dugmore started his musical career initially playing guitar.  However, he became enamored with the drums upon seeing pictures Ringo Starr playing inside his Beatles records, immediately becoming impressed with the drum set equipment.  He eventually traded his guitar equipment with a school friend for a drum set.  At the age of 13 he started making demos and sending them to record labels, and also played in cover bands from the age of 16. Signed to the short-lived Coma Records, at age 16 he released just one recording on the label. Dugmore moved to London at the age of 18 with his band The Europeans (Steve Hogarth, Colin Woore & Fergus Harper) and signed to A&M Records. They released three albums: Vocabulary, Live and Recurring Dreams. The band achieved much critical acclaim within the industry but broke up shortly after the release of the last album.

In 1993 Dugmore and Nigel Butler produced Belouis Some's album Living Your Life

His first major recording session after the Europeans was Joan Armatrading's Sleight of Hand. Soon Dugmore was playing on albums with many major artists from around the world including on Tina Turner's Foreign Affair, Stevie Nicks' Other Side of the Mirror, Rod Stewart's single "Downtown Train", Robbie Williams' Life through a Lens, Demi Lovato's Here we Go Again and Killing Joke's Pandemonium. He has toured constantly with many major acts worldwide and more recently has been recording with Richard Ashcroft and Newton Faulkner.
In 2013, Dugmore produced the debut album for Little Eye.

To date, Dugmore has performed on 89 Top 20 albums worldwide.

Equipment
Dugmore currently plays DW drums, Remo drumheads, Sabian cymbals, and also uses Vater drumsticks.

Live tours

Ronnie Lane Memorial Concert
1 Giant Leap
Damien Saez
Robert Palmer
Paul Rodgers
Mike Scott
Killing Joke
Debbie Harry
Climie Fisher
Thompson Twins
The Waterboys
Belouis Some
Eikichi Yazawa
Wildlife
The Europeans
Fine Young Cannibals
Psyched Up Janis
Jimmy Nail
Ray Davies
Tim Finn
Heather Nova
Johnny Hallyday
Lulu
Xu Wei
CBGB's Special with Debbie Harry, Iggy Pop, Deee-lite, Anthony Kiedis, Lou Reed

Discography 
 1986 Joan Armatrading, Sleight of Hand
 1986 Tim Finn, Big Canoe
 1989 Bankstatement, Bankstatement
 1989 Stevie Nicks, The Other Side of the Mirror
 1989 Debbie Harry, Def, Dumb & Blonde
 1989 Tina Turner, Foreign Affair
 1992 Brian May, Back to the Light
 1993 Debbie Harry, Debravation
 1994 Jimmy Nail, Crocodile Shoes
 1994 Killing Joke, Pandemonium
 1995 Peter Murphy, Cascade
 1995 Jimmy Nail, Big River
 1996 Killing Joke, Democracy
 1997 Robbie Williams, Life Thru A Lens
 1998 Heather Nova, Siren
 1999 Dido, No Angel
 2001 Natalie Imbruglia, White Lilies Island
 2001 Ian McNabb, Ian McNabb
 2001 Ian McNabb, Waifs & Strays
 2003 Mark Owen, In Your Own Time
 2005 Natalie Imbruglia, Counting Down the Days
 2005 Lee Ryan, Lee Ryan
 2008 Will Young, Let It Go
 2011 Heather Nova, 300 Days at Sea
 2012 Ronan Keating, Fires
 2016 Richard Ashcroft, These People
 2019 Heather Nova, Pearl

References

Bibliography
Further reading:
 

Living people
Scottish drummers
British male drummers
1960 births
Musicians from Glasgow